Dennis Kodwo Nkrumah-Korsah (born 25 February 1996) is a Ghanaian footballer who currently plays as a left-back for Ghana Premier League side Hearts of Oak. He previously played for Cape Coast Ebusua Dwarfs, whom he captained.

Career

Ebusua Dwarfs 
Nkrumah-Korsah started his career with Cape Coast Ebusua Dwarfs in June 2016. He made his debut on 26 June 2016 after coming on in the 74th minute for Francis Arthur-Mensah in a 3–0 loss to Aduana Stars. He ended the 2016 Ghanaian Premier League season with six league appearances. During the 2017 season, he established himself as the first choice left-back and played twenty-one league matches out of thirty, in process playing a key role as Dwarfs finished the season in fourth place. He played 14 league matches in the 2018 season and scored one goal, his debut goal by scoring a decisive 89th-minute goal in a match against Liberty Professionals, to help Dwarfs to a 2–1 home victory on 15 April 2018. The league was abandoned halfway due to the dissolution of the GFA in June 2018, as a result of the Anas Number 12 Expose.

In 2019, Nkrumah-Korsah was appointed as the club's captain after Joseph Amoah Mensah had served as captain in 2018. He played nine matches during the 2019 GFA Normalization Committee Special Competition his first season as captain. He played 11 league matches during the 2019–20 season before the league was cancelled due to COVID-19 pandemic in Ghana. He kept his place on the team whilst captaining the side by making the squad list ahead of the 2020–21 season. In November 2020 during the first match of the season he scored the club's first goal of the season by converting a penalty in a 2–2 draw to rivals Elmina Sharks. Dwarfs's second goal was a free-kick scored by their goalkeeper Razak Issah. On 21 February 2021, he scored a direct free kick in a 2–1 loss against Asante Kotoko. He scored another one on 4 July 2021 to help Dwarfs secure a 1–1 draw. He was named the man of the match at the end of the match.

Despite Dwarfs beating Bechem United 2–1 on the final day of the season they were relegated to the Ghana Division One League on a head-to-head record against Elmina Sharks.

He played 32 league matches, scored 5 goals and made 4 assists, ending the season as the highest scoring defender and defender with the most goal involvements (9).

Hearts of Oak 
Upon a sterling performance for Ebusua Dwarfs in the Division One league , Accra Hearts of Oak signed him on 1 February 2022 to beef up their defence. He was quickly drafted into the first team and produced a good performance in his first match against Real Tamale United which ended in a 0:0 draw . He followed it with consecutive man of the match performance against Asante Kotoko and Legon Cities in the Ghana Premier league. He played all the remaining  matches of the season including the President's Cup and the MTN Fa Cup final , which he won both . He played a total of 15 league matches and 1350 minutes in the 2021/2022 Ghana Premier league season. Due to his exploits in the league, he was undoubtedly among the best left backs in the country.

International career 
With his brilliant performance in the league, he was handed his first Black Stars call up for the double world cup qualification matches against Nigeria.
He helped the team to qualify Ghana to participate in the Qatar 2022.
In June 2022, he was handed a late call up to join the Black Stars to participate in the Kirin Cup tournament in Japan.
He made his debut for the Black Stars by  starting  Black Stars first match in the tournament against Japan. He played as a left midfielder and was substituted in the 68th minute.
He played the 3rd place match against Chile where the team won through penalty shootout.
He is firmly tipped to represent Ghana at the 2022 World Cup in Qatar.

Personal life 
Nkrumah-Korsah obtained  a Bachelor of Education degree in Health, Physical Education and Recreation from the University of Cape Coast in 2018. He was in Casely Hayford Hall of residence throughout his 4 year stay in University of Cape Coast.
He was also part of the University football team.
Former Black Stars team psychologist Professor Mintah introduced him to professional football by signing him to Ebusua Dwarfs whiles he was still a student at University of Cape Coast.

Honours 
Hearts of Oak

 President's Cup: 2022
 Ghanaian FA Cup: 2022

References

External links 
 

Living people
1996 births
Association football defenders
Ebusua Dwarfs players
Ghana Premier League players
Ghanaian footballers
Accra Hearts of Oak S.C. players
Ghana A' international footballers
2022 African Nations Championship players